In 1944, Lt. Robert P. Mathias was a platoon leader with the 508th Parachute Infantry Regiment (PIR) in the 82nd Airborne Division. He was the first American officer killed by German fire on D-Day. As Mathias stood ahead of his men at 0227 hours on D-Day, ready to parachute from his C-47 Dakota over the English Channel on its way to Normandy, he was mortally injured by a burst of enemy fire, but nevertheless managed to lead his team out of the plane.

References

1944 deaths
Year of birth missing
United States Army officers
United States Army personnel killed in World War II